Mokošica is a district in the city of Dubrovnik in Croatia. The suburb consists of Old (Mokošica) and New Mokošica (Nova Mokošica). At the 2011 census, it had a population of 7,940. It is considered one of the most densely populated urban districts in Croatia.

Name 
Mokošica was named after Mokosh, the goddess of fertility and protector of women in Slavic mythology.

Geographical location 
Mokošica is the first major western suburban town of Dubrovnik (7 km from Dubrovnik). It is located just above the Adriatic Highway which leads to Split. From the north and east it is surrounded by the high mountains of the Dalmatian coast. Towards the north lies the slopes of Golubov Kamen Hill.

History 
From the 16th century onwards Mokošica was the summer location for the citizens of Dubrovnik (Houses of Bona, Zuzorić, Ragnina and Giorgi). The most important building is Gozze-Giorgi (Sabino Giorgi) villa where, in 1814, the council met for the last time to restore the Republic of Ragusa. Nearby, there is Mokošica Villa Zamagna with a small chapel as well as ruins of a medieval church St. Pancras.

During the Homeland War, from November 1991 until May 1992, New and Old Mokošica were occupied by the Yugoslav People's Army (JNA), Serbian and Montenegrin armies. New Mokošica recorded less destruction than the old town. It is believed that this was the case because members of guerrilla units were stationed in Old Mokošica.

New Mokošica 
New Mokošica consists of three residential units, that were built in three phases. New urban development dates back to the early 1980s when the first multi-storey dwellings were built. The terrain on which New Mokošica is located abounds with olive groves, vineyards and fields. There are now residential buildings, a primary school sports hall, a kindergarten, health centre, cafes, shops, bank, bakery, post office, betting shops, playgrounds for children and sports courts for adults. There are plans to construct a new church and a large shopping centre.

There is a large number of high-rise buildings that were built in the 1980s and the beginning of the 1990s. The second and third phase of construction involved the evolution of "Our House" to "Small houses". Typical homes are residential buildings of three to four-stories, while the so-called Small houses or urban villas consist of up to two floors and four rooms per house. In 2005, the fourth phase of construction of new buildings from the housing incentive program (POS) began. This has resulted in an entirely new look for the area.

Economy 
The vast majority of employees in Mokošica work in Dubrovnik. Main branches of economy in Mokošica are tourism, shipbuilding and fishing. There are plans to construct a large shopping centre and consequently the development of trade.

In the immediate vicinity of Komolac there is a marina. ACI Marina Dubrovnik in Komolac is the holder of a blue flag, and is located near the source of the river Ombla. The marina is completely protected from storm waves and the sea. It is considered one of the safest marinas in the world.

Transportation 
New Mokošica is connected to Dubrovnik by the Adriatic highway. The 7 kilometre journey is covered frequently by bus lines 1A and 1B of the transportation company Libertas.

Population 
The vast majority of the population are Croats, with small percentages of Serbs and Bosniaks. According to the 2011 census, New Mokošica had 6,016 inhabitants and Old Mokošica 1,924.

References

External links

 http://www.adriatica.net/destinations/hrvatska/juzna-dalmacija/mokosica-dubrovnik_es.htm

Populated places in Dubrovnik-Neretva County